Giacomo Capuzzi (14 August 1929 – 26 December 2021) was an Italian Roman Catholic prelate, who served as a bishop of the Roman Catholic Diocese of Lodi.

Biography 
Capuzzi was ordained priest on 29 June 1952. He was appointed bishop of Lodi on 7 March 1989. Receiving his episcopal consecration on 30 April 1989 from bishop Bruno Foresti. He replaced the previous bishop of Lodi Paolo Magnani. He resigned on 14 December 2005 and lived in Leno as emerit bishop. He died on 26 December 2021, at the age of 92.

References

Resources
Profile of Mons. Capuzzi www.catholic-hierarchy.org
Official page of diocese of Lodi

1929 births
2021 deaths
20th-century Italian Roman Catholic bishops
21st-century Italian Roman Catholic bishops
Bishops of Lodi
Religious leaders from the Province of Brescia